Otto Griebel (31 March 1895 – 7 March 1972) was a German painter. In 1933, he was arrested by the Gestapo and his paintings were branded as degenerate art. His painting "Child at a Table" was one of the artworks found in the 2012 Munich artworks discovery.

See also
 List of German painters

References

1895 births
1972 deaths
20th-century German painters
20th-century German male artists
German male painters